Fredrik "Benke" Rydman (born 29 August 1974) is one of the members from Bounce Streetdance Company. He was also a judge on the first season of So You Think You Can Dance Scandinavia. 

Rydman choreographed the opening number at the Eurovision Song Contest 2013 in Malmö on May 14. In 2015, Rydman co-developed and choreographed the stage presentation of Måns Zelmerlöw's song "Heroes", for both Melodifestivalen 2015 and the performance which went on to win the Eurovision Song Contest 2015.

References

1974 births
Living people
Swedish male dancers
Place of birth missing (living people)